Daniel Lewis (born 18 December 1993) is an Australian professional boxer. As an amateur, he won a gold medal while representing Australia at the 2011 Commonwealth Youth Games.

Amateur career

Commonwealth Youth Games
In 2011, Lewis competed and won gold for Australia at the 2011 Commonwealth Youth Games in the light-welterweight division, winning the final with a score of 27–24.

2014 Commonwealth Games
Lewis finished in sixth place in the boxing men's welterweight at the 2014 Commonwealth Games. Lewis was ruled out of his welterweight quarter-final bout against Indian boxer Mandeep Jangra by medical staff after suffering a cut above the eye during his second round – round of 16 – unanimous points win over Nigeria's Kehinde Ademuyiwa. Lewis and his team called for a return of headgear for the games after he was ruled out.

2016 Rio Olympics
He competed in the men's middleweight event at the 2016 Summer Olympics. He won his first bout in the round of 32 against Polish boxer Tomasz Jabłoński 2–1, but lost his second bout 0–3 in the round of 16 against Uzbek boxer Bektemir Melikuziev.

Professional career
Lewis made his pro-boxing debut on 23 May 2019 at the Wildfighter boxing event presented by Will Tomlinson in Melbourne, Australia where he scored the second round knockout win against Sanong Seepongsert of Thailand.

Professional boxing record

References

External links
 
 

1993 births
Living people
Australian male boxers
Olympic boxers of Australia
Boxers at the 2016 Summer Olympics
Boxers from Sydney
Light-middleweight boxers
Boxers at the 2014 Commonwealth Games
Commonwealth Games competitors for Australia